Unusual Heat is the seventh studio album by British-American rock band Foreigner, released on June 14, 1991 by Atlantic Records. Recorded at several different studios across the state of New York and England, and produced by Terry Thomas and Mick Jones, it was the only album with lead singer Johnny Edwards. He replaced original lead singer Lou Gramm after the latter had parted company in 1990. Edwards, a veteran singer who'd done a tour of duty with Montrose and was then the frontman for another Atlantic act, Wild Horses. As Edwards told UCR in a separate interview, Wild Horses had only just signed its record deal — and although joining for Foreigner was obviously tempting for financial reasons if nothing else, he was reluctant to walk away from his own band after struggling for years to make it on his own terms.

Jones, however, was undeterred — and eager to work with a singer most fans hadn't heard of rather than hiring a big-name replacement who'd come with his own baggage. "We were in rehearsal and talks with a couple of guys who were both strong candidates and had kind of a name," he admitted. "I felt eventually that it was probably going to be better to not try and put an all-star band together, but to keep on the same kind of path with four people being involved in making a record and not really, I think I would probably say, cheapening the band at that point — cheapening the meaning and the direction of the band."

Unusual Heat was a huge commercial failure, only peaking at number 117 on the Billboard 200 chart – a sharp decline in sales comparing with all previous albums, all of which reached the Top 20 and became at least Platinum. Neither of the two singles released from the album charted on the Billboard Hot 100, with "Lowdown and Dirty" only charting on the Mainstream Rock chart at #4.

The original version of the song "Ready for the Rain", demoed by the Sacramento, CA based band Northrup in the late 1980s with Johnny Edwards on lead vocals, was finally released in 2001 by Metal Mayhem Music as part of a collection of demos under the name JK Northrup.

Track listing

Personnel

Foreigner 
 Johnny Edwards – lead vocals, backing vocals, lead guitar (on "Mountain of Love")
 Mick Jones – keyboards, lead guitar, guitars, backing vocals
 Rick Wills – bass, backing vocals
 Dennis Elliott – drums

Additional musicians 
 Richard Cottle – keyboards
 Tommy Mandel – keyboards
 Terry Thomas – keyboards, guitars, backing vocals
 Tony Beard – electronic percussion
 Felix Krish – bass
 Ian Lloyd – backing vocals
 Mark Rivera – backing vocals
 Rachele Cappelli – backing vocals
 Angela Cappelli – backing vocals
 Lani Groves – backing vocals
 Vaneese Thomas – backing vocals

Production 
 Producers – Mick Jones and Terry Thomas
 Recording Engineers – Rafe McKenna (Tracks 1, 3, 5-8 & 10); Andrew Scarth (Tracks 2, 4 & 9).
 Assistant Engineers – Bruce Calder, Ellen Fitton, Michael Gilbert, Lolly Grodner, John Herman, Jon Mallison and Bernhard Speyer.
 Mixing – Mick Jones and Terry Thomas (All tracks); Rafe McKenna (Tracks 1, 3, 5-8 & 10); Andrew Scarth (Tracks 2, 4 & 9).
 Mastered by Ted Jensen at Sterling Sound (New York, NY).
 Art Direction – Reiner Design Consultants
 Photography – Timothy White
 Art Direction for band photography – Bob Defrin
 Management – Bud Prager for E.S.P. Management, Inc.

Charts

Weekly charts

Year-end charts

References

External links
The Official Foreigner Website

Foreigner (band) albums
1991 albums
Atlantic Records albums
Albums produced by Mick Jones (Foreigner)